El otro , is a Mexican telenovela that aired on Telesistema Mexicano (now Televisa) in 1960. With 29 episodes of 30 minutes duration. Production of Ernesto Alonso. Starring Julio Alemán and Amparo Rivelles.

Cast 
 Julio Alemán
 Amparo Rivelles
 Anita Blanch
 Isabelita Blanch
 Eduardo Alcaraz
 Germán Robles
 Olivia Mitchel
 Antonio Raxel

Production 
Original Story: Caridad Bravo Adams
Adaptation:Caridad Bravo Adams
Produced: Ernesto Alonso

References 

1960 telenovelas
Mexican telenovelas
Televisa telenovelas
Television shows set in Mexico City
1960 Mexican television series debuts
1960 Mexican television series endings
Spanish-language telenovelas